Abused Confidence is a 1938 French drama film directed by Henri Decoin and starring Danielle Darrieux and Charles Vanel.

Plot
A female law student pretends to be the daughter of a famous historian.

Selected cast 
 Danielle Darrieux as Lydia
 Charles Vanel as Jacques Ferney
 Valentine Tessier as Hélène Ferney
 Pierre Mingand as Pierre Montant
 Yvette Lebon as Alice
 Thérèse Dorny as the landlady
 Jean Worms as the tribunal's president
 Gilbert Gil as Paul
 René Bergeron as Dieulafoy
 Svetlana Pitoëff as Renée Leclerc
 Jean Marais as Marais
 Jean Joffre as Le directeur de la Voix Populaire

References

External links

Abus de confiance at filmsdefrance.com

1938 films
French black-and-white films
Columbia Pictures films
French drama films
1938 drama films
1930s French-language films
1930s French films
1940s French films